The Lonja del Comercio (Commerce Market) building in Old Havana, Cuba served as the stock exchange in the capital until the 1959 Cuban Revolution. Today, it is an office building.

History
The Lonja del Comercio first opened in March 1909. Set obliquely to the Plaza de San Francisco de Asís on its north side, it was designed in a mainly Renaissance and eclectic style as a commodities trading building. It is in close proximity to Basilica Menor de San Francisco de Asis. The dome is crowned by a bronze statue of Mercury, a replica of the original work of the messenger god by Flemish artist Giovanni Bologna.

Architecture

The construction of the Lonja del Comercio began in 1907 and ended in 1909. The building has a stone facing and a steel frame. It was designed by architects Thomas Mur and Jose Toraya, the structural engineers were the U.S. company Purdy and Henderson, engineers for many important Havana buildings including the Hotel Nacional, the National Theatre of Cuba, El Capitolio building, the Gran Teatro de La Habana and the 1947 Radiocentro CMQ Building by the architect Martín Domínguez Esteban who also designed the FOCSA Building in 1956.,

Parti pris

The Parti pris of the Lonja del Comercio building in plan is a perfect square and based on the classic 9 square cube problem that was used, among others, by Peter Eisenman to design some of his houses  and Andrea Palladio in the design of many of his villas. 
The five-storey building has a steel frame structure. In 1939, an additional floor was added. The ground floor was originally used for warehouses and the stock market, the 2nd and 3rd floors provided office space, while the 4th and 5th floors, which adopted more sober ornamentation, were leased to customs brokers and trading companies.

Renovation
After the Cuban Revolution, the Lonja del Comercio building suffered architectural deterioration through neglect. Although the Lonja del Comercio building was part of a capital rehabilitation program that was carried out in 1995 by the Office of the City Historian, in 1989 there is little indication that other similar buildings will be saved at least in the near future.

Gallery

See also

List of buildings in Havana
El Templete
Purdy and Henderson, Engineers
Gran Teatro de La Habana
Radiocentro CMQ Building
Palacio de los Capitanes Generales

Notes

References

Bibliography
 La Habana: guía de arquitectura

External links
Plaza San Francisco, La Habana - Cuba
Plaza de San Francisco. Havana, Cuba

Office buildings completed in 1909
Buildings and structures in Havana
1909 establishments in Cuba
20th-century architecture in Cuba